Ansgar Vonier, engl. Anscar Vonier, O.S.B. (11 November 1875 in Ringschnait, Oberschwaben – 26 December 1938 in Buckfast), was an Abbot of Buckfast Abbey (1906–1938).

Life
Born Martin Vonier in 1875 (on the feast of Martin of Tours), he came from a large family, that had emigrated to Württember from the Tyrol. His father was a farmer, who also ran a brickworks. After a few years, the family moved to Rissegg, where Martin attended the local school and became an altar boy.<ref name=Clark>[https://www.oxforddnb.com/view/10.1093/ref:odnb/9780198614128.001.0001/odnb-9780198614128-e-65088 Clark, Augustine. "Vonier, Martin", Oxford Dictionary of National Biography"]</ref>

In 1888, Vonier was one of the youths recruited for the new abbey at Buckfast. The boys were first sent to a school in Beauvais run by the Holy Ghost Fathers in order to learn French. They arrived at Buckfast in the summer of 1889.

After four years in the alumnate, Vonier entered the novitiate in 1893, and was given the name "Anscar". He was professed the following year, and ordained in 1898 by bishop Charles Maurice Graham. In 1900, he was sent to study at St. Anselmo's in Rome, where he received a doctorate in philosophy.

In November 1905, Vonier was sent back to St. Anselmo's to teach philosophy. He was returning the following summer in the company of Buckfast's abbot, Boniface Natter, when their ship, the SS Sirio, was shipwrecked off the Spanish coast. Natter and Vonier ministered to the steerage passengers in the ensuing chaos. Dom Natter was among the many who drowned. When news of the sinking reached the Community at Buckfast it was believed that both Abbot and Vonier had perished and Requiem Masses were said for the repose of their souls. However, Vonier was saved by a fishing vessel. 

On 14 September 1906 Vonier was elected by the Community to succeed Boniface as the second Abbot of Buckfast. He was thirty-one years old. Dom Vonier decided to rebuild the abbey church on the site of the original Cistercian church. The foundation stone was laid in January 1907.

 Work 
 The Christian Mind The Personality of Christ The Victory of Christ The Divine Motherhood The Spirit and the Bride The People of God A Key to the Doctrine of the Eucharist The Human Soul and Its Relations with Other Spirits Christianus The Life of the World to Come''

References

1875 births
1938 deaths
People from Biberach an der Riss
People from the Kingdom of Württemberg
German Benedictines
Benedictine abbots